The Canadian Army Veteran Motorcycle Units (CAV MU) is a riding club, or more precisely an organized association of military veteran motorcycle riders.

The CAV MU is composed of thousands of Canadian Army, Royal Canadian Air Force and Royal Canadian Navy veterans and still serving members of the Canadian Forces, as well as veteran motorcycle enthusiasts from the UK, Australia and US. Many members have served in regiments, bases and ships both in Canada and in overseas theatres of operations.

The CAV MU attempts to maintain the values of uniformed service; those of integrity, legitimacy, honour and strength in their veteran's duties to their community, and to keep alive the bonds formed during their military service.

CAV members ride motorcycles of different types, including cruisers, baggers, choppers, sport bikes, tricycles (more commonly referred to as trikes), touring motorcycles, and dual-sport and enduro.

History 

Started in 2003, two military veteran motorcyclists meeting at a local charity ride, developed an idea that a military motorcyclist organization was needed. The two co-founders, P.M. 'Trapper' Cane and J.S.Y. 'Doc' Lebrun adopted the name Canadian Army Veteran (CAV) and a WWII crest of a despatch rider as their crest, which had been used in a World War II recruiting poster in Canada. The co-founders' inspiration was the continuance of the military comradeship that brothers-in-arms experience.

Within the first five years The CAV had grown by thousands of riding military veterans and Canadian Forces (CF) from across Canada and Canada's North. Now named as Canadian Army Veteran Motorcycle Units (CAV MU) this military motorcycle organization now reflects a more national scope.

As the CAV MU grew so did the organizational requirements, although the emphasis remains on individual units.

Fundraising and awards
The CAV MU, has helped raise funds for international, national and local charities, totalling in the millions of dollars. CAV was the 2007 recipient of the ICROSS Humanitarian Award.

Formations and units
Due to the strong military association, instead of more typical 'chapters', the CAV is organised along military lines, into four formations comprising several units. Each unit is named after or associated with a 'battle honour'. Many units possess a membership in the hundreds.

The CAV has a national headquarters and three formation headquarters (HQ). 1st CAV is based generally on central Canada, including Quebec, 2nd CAV is based on Newfoundland and Labrador and the Maritimes, and 3rd CAV on Western and Northern Canada. A fourth formation, CAV International was developed to provide units to Canadian veterans and CF members in different parts of the world.

Central Canada
1st CAV HQ, Manitoba, Ontario, Quebec
Battle of Vimy Ridge Vimy Unit 
Battle of Amiens Unité Amiens (French) 
Operation Shingle Anzio Unit 
Korean War Unité Coreé, (French)
Dieppe Raid  Dieppe Unit 
Juno Beach Juno Unit 
Battle of Kapyong Kapyong Unit  
Battle of Normandy Normandy Unit 
Battle of Assoro Assoro Unit
Battle of Ortona Ortona Unit 
Paardeberg Unit 
Battle of the Somme Somme Unit 
Falaise gap Falaise Unit 
Battle of Cambrai (1917) Cambrai Unit 
Hindenburg Line Hindenburg Line 
Allied invasion of Sicily  Assoro Unit
Operation Undergo Unité Calais (French)
Operation Blockbuster  Hochwald Unit
North Russia Campaign  Archangel Unit
The Argyll and Sutherland Highlanders of Canada (Princess Louise's) BAD ZWISCHENAHN Unit
Regalbuto Unit
Rhineland Unit
Sicily Unit
St Lawrence Unit
Verrieres Ridge Unit
Arras Unit
Casa Berardi Unit
Cassino Unit
Gulf Kuwait Unit
Niagara Unit
Oldenburg Unit
Ruhr Unit (French)
Ma sum Ghar Unit  Afghanistan (French)
Panjwai Unit Afghanistan (French)

Eastern Canada
2nd CAV HQ
Battle of Passchendaele  Passchendaele Unit
Beaumont-Hamel Unit 
Battle of the Atlantic Unit 
Gothic line Unit 
Battle of Gallipoli Gallipoli Unit 
Boer War South Africa Unit
Battle of Dunkirk Dunkirk Unit
Fortress Europe Unit

Western and Northern Canada
3rd CAV HQ
Ypres Unit 
Royal Canadian Engineers Ubique Unit 
Second Battle of Ypres Frezenberg Unit 
Gustav Line Liri Valley Unit 
Battle of the Reichswald The Reichswald Unit 
Operation Tonga Dives Crossing Unit 
Gothic Line Coriano Ridge Unit 
Battle of Britain  Battle of Britain Unit 
Battle of the Scheldt Scheldt Unit 
Gothic Line  Rimini Unit 
Battle for Caen Caen Unit 
Hill 70 Unit 
Mount Sorrel Unit 
The Moro River Campaign The Moro Unit 
Kosovo War Kosovo Unit 
Battle of the Ancre Heights Unit 
Second Battle of Ypres  Gravenstafel Unit

C.A.V. International
UK
Europe
US
Middle East

See also
Motorcycling
Types of motorcycle
Motorcycle club
List of motorcycle clubs
List of veterans organizations
Royal Canadian Legion
International Community for the Relief of Suffering and Starvation

References 

 The CAV Website
 https://www.thecav.ca/uploads/2/4/2/4/24249484/cav_constitution_sep_2022_ver_3.0.pdf The CAV Constitution]
 CAV Members' Requirements
 https://www.thecav.ca/uploads/2/4/2/4/24249484/ride_manual_2017.pdf
 Canadian Archival Information Network CAIN:183978
 The CAV WIA Initiative
 Department of National Defence – Canadian Forces

External links

 The CAV MU website

Motorcycle clubs in Canada
2003 establishments in Canada